Chujiang Subdistrict is a subdistrict and the county seat of Shimen in Hunan, China. Chujiang Town is located in the south central Shimen County, it is bordered by Yijiadu Town to the northeast and east, Erdu Township to the south, Xinguan Town to the west and north.

History
Chujiang is an ancient town, it was formerly known as Shimen. The seat of Tianmen Prefecture was transferred to the place during the period of Southern dynasties (420–589 AD). In the 2nd year of Emperor Wu of Chen dynasty (558 AD), Tianmen Prefecture was renamed as Shimen Prefecture. In the 9th year of Emperor Wen of Sui (589 AD), Shimen County was established while Shimen Prefecutre ceased as a prefecture. then after that, it has been the seat of Shimen County. 

The town was named as Tianmen Town in 1935, and changed as Zhongxin Township in 1938. It was reorganized as town of Chujiang taken its name after the famous Chujiang Tower there in 1943. It was renamed as Chengguan Town in January 1951 and reorganized as Chengshi People's Commune in April 1960, and Chengguan Town in July 1972. it was resumed  the name of Chujiang in June 1995.

References

Shimen County
County seats in Hunan